Wings is a bimonthly Canadian magazine that focuses on stories related to business and commercial aviation. The magazine is the official publication partner of the Aerospace Industries Association of Canada (AIAC) together with Helicopters magazine.

References

External links
 Official website

Aviation magazines
Bi-monthly magazines published in Canada
Trade magazines published in Canada
Magazines with year of establishment missing